Lucy Lee (born 23 July 1943) is an American actress.

Education and early life 
Flippin was born in Philadelphia, Pennsylvania and was raised in Douglassville, Pennsylvania. She attended Northwestern University and spent a year performing with Holiday on Ice before pursuing a career in acting. Later she studied acting under Uta Hagen.

Career 
She initially began her career in New York City where she eventually got several TV commercials and off-Broadway theatre work, most notably opposite Richard Gere in a Lincoln Center production of A Midsummer Night's Dream. At the advice of her agent, she relocated to Los Angeles where she would get roles in television series and films.

She played Eliza Jane Wilder on the TV series Little House on the Prairie. She also played Fran Castleberry, the younger sister of Polly Holliday's character on the show Flo. After Little House on the Prairie stopped production, she appeared in many different television shows and movies, and has performed onstage at Geffen Playhouse in Los Angeles. She retired in 2008.

Filmography

References

External links 
 

Living people
1943 births
American film actresses
American stage actresses
American television actresses
Actresses from Pennsylvania
People from Berks County, Pennsylvania
21st-century American women